The Priory Church of St George in Dunster, Somerset, England, is predominantly 15th-century with evidence of 12th- and 13th-century work. It has been designated as a Grade I listed building.

History

The church was started by William de Moyon during the 11th century.

The tower was built by Jon Marys of Stogursey who received a contract from the parish in 1442. He was paid 13s 4d for each foot in height and £1 for the pinnacles. The work was completed in three years. Aisles were added in 1504.

The church was shared for worship between the monks of Dunster Priory and the parishioners, however this led to several conflicts between them. One outcome was the carved rood screen which divided the church in two with the parish using the west chancel and the monks the east.

It was restored in 1875–77 by George Edmund Street. The church has a cruciform plan with a central four-stage tower, built in 1443 with diagonal buttresses, a stair turret and single bell-chamber windows.

See also
 Grade I listed buildings in West Somerset
 List of Somerset towers
 List of ecclesiastical parishes in the Diocese of Bath and Wells

References

External links
 St George, Dunster on A Church Near You

Further reading
 

Church of England church buildings in West Somerset
15th-century church buildings in England
Grade I listed churches in Somerset
Grade I listed buildings in West Somerset
G. E. Street buildings